Gabriel José Almeida Lopes (born 15 May 1997) is a Portuguese swimmer. He competed in the men's 50 metre backstroke event at the 2017 World Aquatics Championships. In 2019, he competed in three events at the 2019 World Aquatics Championships held in Gwangju, South Korea. He competed in the men's 200 metre individual medley at the 2020 Summer Olympics.

References

External links
 

1997 births
Living people
People from Lousã
Portuguese male medley swimmers
Portuguese male backstroke swimmers
Swimmers at the 2015 European Games
European Games competitors for Portugal
Swimmers at the 2018 Mediterranean Games
Mediterranean Games competitors for Portugal
Swimmers at the 2020 Summer Olympics
Olympic swimmers of Portugal
Sportspeople from Coimbra District
20th-century Portuguese people
21st-century Portuguese people
Swimmers at the 2022 Mediterranean Games
European Aquatics Championships medalists in swimming